Sir Orville Alton Turnquest  (born 19 July 1928) is a politician who was the Deputy Prime Minister and Foreign Minister of the Bahamas from 1992 to 1994, and the sixth governor-general of the Bahamas from 3 January 1995 until his retirement on 13 November 2001.

Biography
Turnquest was born in Grants Town, New Providence, to Robert and Gwendolyn Turnquest. After obtaining his Cambridge Junior Certificate, Cambridge Senior Certificate and London Matriculation Certificate at the Government High School between 1942 and 1945, he was articled in the law chambers of the late Hon. A. F. Adderley from 1947 to 1953, being called to The Bahamas Bar on 26 June 1953. He subsequently studied at the University of London (1957–60), earning a bachelor of laws degree (LLB) with honours, and in July 1960 was admitted to the English Bar as a member of Lincoln's Inn.

He served as Bahamian Attorney-General and Minister of Justice and Foreign Affairs from 21 August 1992, and became Deputy Prime Minister, Attorney-General and Minister of Foreign Affairs on 1 September 1993. He was knighted in 1995.

Honours
:
 Knight Grand Cross of the Order of St Michael and St George (GCMG) (1995)
:
 Member of the Order of the Nation (ON) (2018)

References

External links
Biography of Orville Turnquest

1928 births
Living people
Alumni of the University of London
Governors-General of the Bahamas
Deputy Prime Ministers of the Bahamas
Foreign ministers of the Bahamas
Attorneys General of the Bahamas
Knights Grand Cross of the Order of St Michael and St George
Bahamian Queen's Counsel
Progressive Liberal Party politicians
People from New Providence
20th-century Bahamian lawyers